Robert D. (Bob) Russell is professor of mathematics at Simon Fraser University.

Russell together with Uri Ascher and Robert Mattheij is the author of the seminal Numerical Solution of Boundary Value Problems for Ordinary Differential Equations which was subsequently republished as a SIAM Classic. His latest book is Adaptive Moving Mesh Methods with Weizhang Huang

In 2009 Russell was made a SIAM Fellow for his contributions to the numerical analysis of differential equations.

Notable publications 
 Numerical Solution of Boundary Value Problems for Ordinary Differential Equations (1988) with Uri M. Ascher and Robert M. Mattheij.
 Adaptive Moving Mesh Methods (2011) with Weizhang Huang.

References

PhD students 

 Luca Dieci, University of New Mexico, 1986
 Yuhe Ren, Simon Fraser University, 1991
 Lixin Liu, Simon Fraser University, 1993
 Kossi Edoh, Simon Fraser University, 1995	
 Daryl Hepting, Simon Fraser University, 1999	
 Michael Lunney, Simon Fraser University, 2000	
 Shaohua Chen, Simon Fraser University, 2000	
 Ronald Haynes, Simon Fraser University, 2003	
 Benjamin Ong, Simon Fraser University, 2007	
 Mohamed Sulman, Simon Fraser University, 2008	
 Xiangmin Xu,Simon Fraser University, 2008

External links 
  at Simon Fraser University

Numerical analysts
Canadian mathematicians
Living people
Fellows of the Society for Industrial and Applied Mathematics
Year of birth missing (living people)